Ana Isabel de Palacio y del Valle Lersundi (born 22 July 1948) in Madrid, daughter of Luis María de Palacio y de Palacio, 4th Marqués de Matonte, and wife Luisa Mariana del Valle Lersundi y del Valle, was Spain's minister for foreign affairs in the People's Party (PP) government of José María Aznar from July 2002 to March 2004. Before this she was a lawyer in Madrid and then a Member of the European Parliament from 1994 to 2002. In March 2012, she was appointed an elective member of the Spanish Council of State. She currently is the founding partner of Palacio y Asociados, a Madrid-based consulting and law firm, and a senior strategic counsel at Albright Stonebridge Group, a global business strategy firm.

Early life and education
Palacio graduated from the Lycée Français (Baccalauréat on Mathematics) with honors granted by the French Government to “the best foreign student who finished studies that year”. She holds degrees in law, and political science and sociology; her performance in her degree studies merited the Award for Academic Achievement (Premio Extraordinario Fin de Carrera).

Legal career
As a lawyer, Palacio has held the most senior positions in the governing bodies of the Madrid Bar, as well as the European Bar (CCBE). She is an honorary member of the bar of England and Wales. She also served as a member of the board of trustees and former executive president of the Academy of European Law (ERA); and distinguished professor of the European College in Parma. She has worked as a practicing lawyer specializing in EU internal market law.

Political career

Member of the European Parliament, 1994–2002
Palacio spent eight years (1994–2002) with the European Parliament, where she chaired the Committee on Legal Affairs and Internal Market and the Committee on Justice and Home Affairs, and was elected by her peers to chair in two half legislatures the Conference of Committee Chairmen, the Parliament's most senior body for the coordination of its legislative work. Inspired by legal legitimacy as the mark of identity of the EU, her main addresses and reports have pinpointed the legislation on internal market as well as the security area, especially focused on justice and home affairs and human rights.

From 1995 until 1999, Palacio also served on the committee on the Rules of Procedure, the Verification of Credentials and Immunities. In addition to her committee assignments, she was a member of the parliament's delegation for relations with the Palestinian Legislative Council from 1999 until 2002.

Minister of Foreign Affairs, 2002–2004
As part of a cabinet reshuffle, Prime Minister José María Aznar appointed Palacio as foreign minister, replacing Josep Piqué. She was the first woman to serve as Spain's foreign minister and, at the time, held the most senior post ever filled by a woman in the Spanish government.

During her time in office, Spain and Morocco formally ended their 2002 military standoff over the uninhabited islet of Perejil, or Leila, and agreed to improve the highly charged relations between the two countries.

Prior to her appointment to the World Bank, she served as member of the Spanish Parliament, representing Toledo, (Madelein Albright, congress woman, has an English version of 'Alvarez de Toledo' surname) where she chaired the Joint Committee of the two Houses for European Union Affairs. As Prime Minister Aznar's representative to the European Convention and the convention's Presidium, Palacio was at the forefront of the debate on the future of the European Union and actively participated in the drafting and legal discussions pertaining the reform of the treaties governing the European Union.

Career at the UN
Palacio served on the UN High Level Commission on the Legal Empowerment of the Poor between 2005 and 2006.

World Bank President Paul Wolfowitz announced on 19 June 2006 Palacio's appointment as senior vice-president and general counsel of the World Bank effective August 28, 2006. One of her primary duties, as general counsel, involved Palacio's serving as secretary general of the International Centre for Settlement of Investment Disputes, which is the division of the World Bank responsible for administrating arbitrations and conciliation between individuals and states under investment protection treaties, concession agreements and other foreign investment protection instruments, including certain national investment laws.

Other activities
Since 2010, Palacio has been the founding partner of Palacio y Asociados, a Madrid-based consulting and law firm, and also serving as a senior strategic counsel for Albright Stonebridge Group, an international strategic consulting firm. She has been visiting professor of the Edmund A. Walsh School of Foreign Service at Georgetown University since 2014.

Since 2011, Palacio has written monthly comments on global strategy for international media organization Project Syndicate.

In addition, she currently holds various paid and unpaid positions.

Corporate boards
 Enagás, lead independent coordinating director on the board of directors
 PharmaMar, member of the board of directors
 Investcorp, member of the international advisory board 
 Anadarko, member of the international advisory board
 Areva, member of the executive board (2008–2009)

Non-profit organizations
 Atlantic Council, member of the board of directors 
 Council on Foreign Relations, member of the international advisory board
 Carnegie Corporation of New York, member of the board of trustees
 Elcano Royal Institute, member of the scientific council
 European Council on Foreign Relations (ECFR), member
 European Leadership Network (ELN), Senior Network member, member of the Task Force on Cooperation in Greater Europe
 Global Leadership Foundation (GLF), member
 Institut Montaigne, member of the advisory board
 Migration Policy Institute (MPI), member of the Transatlantic Council on Migration
 New Pact for Europe, member of the advisory group
 Aspen Institute Italia, member of the advisory board
 Instituto de Empresa (IE), member of the advisory board
 University of Texas MD Anderson Cancer Center, member of the board of trustees
 Le Conseil d’Orientation et de Réflexion de l’Assurance (CORA), member
 Fundación para el Análisis y los Estudios Sociales (FAES), member of the advisory board
 Foundation pour l’Innovation Politique, member of the advisory board
 Fundación para las Relaciones Internacionales (FRIDE), member of the advisory board
 CSIS Initiative for a Renewed Transatlantic Partnership, member of the advisory board
 The American Interest, member of the global advisory council 
 Revue de Droit de l’Union européenne, member of the global advisory council
 World Justice Project, honorary co-chair
 Prague European Summit, advisory board member

In 2003, Palacio created together with other prominent European personalities the Medbridge Strategy Center, whose goal is to promote dialogue and mutual understanding between Europe and the Middle-East.

Recognition
In January 2004 Palacio was listed among The Wall Street Journal’s 75 ‘global opinion leaders’. In October 2001 the same newspaper, under the heading "Europe’s Lawyer", published an extensive feature article on her in its supplement on "12 influential players on the world business stage".  Among the awards and decorations she has been bestowed upon, she is the recipient of the 2004 American Jewish Committee Ramer Award for Diplomatic Excellence, which recognizes her role in upholding democracy and the values of open society.

In 2016, Palacio was awarded the Sandra Day O’Connor Justice Prize.

Personal life
In December 2000, Palacio was diagnosed with cancer. She refused to wear a wig or a hat when the chemotherapy made her hair fall out. Her sister, Loyola de Palacio, was a minister in the Spanish government from 1996 to 1998, and a member of the European Commission from 1999 to 2004; she died of a fulminant hepatitis while receiving therapy for cancer in Madrid 'Doce de Octubre' hospital, in 2006.

References

External links

www.medbridge.org

|-

1948 births
Living people
Women government ministers of Spain
Members of the 8th Congress of Deputies (Spain)
People's Party (Spain) politicians
People from Madrid
Spanish people of Basque descent
Female foreign ministers
Foreign ministers of Spain
Complutense University of Madrid alumni
21st-century Spanish women politicians
Spanish women diplomats
20th-century Spanish diplomats
21st-century Spanish diplomats